Pediapelta is a genus of tephritid  or fruit flies in the family Tephritidae.

Species
Pediapelta aenea Munro, 1947
Pediapelta alexina Munro, 1947
Pediapelta asmarensis Munro, 1955
Pediapelta enzoria Munro, 1947
Pediapelta spadicescens Munro, 1947
Pediapelta ternaria (Loew, 1861)

References

Tephritinae
Tephritidae genera
Diptera of Africa